Henri Leonetti (6 January 1937 – 27 February 2018) was a French footballer who played as a defender.

Career
Born in Marseille, he played for Marseille and La Ciotat.

Personal life
He died on 27 February 2018, aged 81. His brother Jean-Louis was also a footballer.

References

1937 births
2018 deaths
French footballers
Olympique de Marseille players
ES La Ciotat players
Ligue 1 players
Ligue 2 players
Association football defenders
Footballers from Marseille